Lindsay Morse Bennett (born January 24, 1955) is an American former professional tennis player.

Morse, who grew up in Pasadena, California, was a collegiate player for UC Irvine and won the AIAW Singles Championship in 1977. She competed on the professional tour in the early 1980s and made several grand slam appearances. This included the 1980 Wimbledon Championships, where she fell in the third round to Chris Evert Lloyd. She won a WTA Tour doubles title in Nagoya in 1980, partnering UC Irvine teammate Jean Nachand.

WTA Tour finals

Doubles (1–0)

References

External links
 
 

1955 births
Living people
American female tennis players
Tennis people from California
Sportspeople from Pasadena, California
UC Irvine Anteaters athletes
College women's tennis players in the United States